Gamma Epsilon Tau ( or GET) is a co-ed American collegiate honors fraternity for graphic artists. As of 2013 the fraternity has eight active chapters, with the national chapter located at the Rochester Institute of Technology in Rochester, NY.

History 
Gamma Epsilon Tau was originally formed in 1953 at an annual conference of the International Graphic Arts Education Association (IGAEA) held in New York City. Members of the printing-oriented group Xi Omicron Pi from the University of California at Santa Barbara worked with another group on the East Coast establish the fraternity. This coincided with an increase in graphic design programs in American higher education.

The fraternity is a national co-educational honor society focused on graphic arts education. GET provides professional and social networking opportunities to undergraduates and alumni. Prospective members must meet certain academic, moral, and participatory standards to join the organization.

Active chapters

References

Student organizations established in 1953
Fraternities and sororities in the United States
Graphic design
1953 establishments in New York City